Newport is an unincorporated community in Page County, Virginia, United States.

Geography 

Catherine Furnace was listed on the National Register of Historic Places in 1974.

References

Unincorporated communities in Page County, Virginia
Unincorporated communities in Virginia